The National Union was the sole legal party of the Estado Novo regime in Portugal, founded in July 1930 and dominated by António de Oliveira Salazar during most of its existence.

Unlike in most single-party regimes, the National Union was more of a political arm of the government rather than holding actual power over it. The National Union membership was mostly drawn from local notables: landowners, professionals and businessmen, Catholics, monarchists or conservative republicans. The National Union was never a militant or very active organization.

Once Salazar assumed the premiership, the National Union became the only party legally allowed to function under the Estado Novo. Salazar announced that the National Union would be the antithesis of a political party. The NU became an ancillary body, not a source of political power. At no stage did it appear that Salazar wished it to fulfill the central role the Fascist Party had acquired in Mussolini's Italy; in fact, it was meant to be a platform of conservatism, not a revolutionary vanguard.

The National Union's ideology was corporatism, and it took as many inspirations from Catholic encyclicals such as Rerum novarum and Quadragesimo anno as well as from Mussolini's corporate state. Compared to other ruling Fascist parties, the National Union played a much smaller role in its regime. The National Union was set up to control and restrain public opinion rather than to mobilize it, and ministers, diplomats and civil servants were never compelled to join the party.

Scholarly opinion varies on whether the Estado Novo and the National Union should be considered fascist or not. Salazar himself criticized the "exaltation of youth, the cult of force through direct action, the principle of the superiority of state political power in social life, [and] the propensity for organizing masses behind a single leader" as fundamental differences between fascism and the Catholic corporatism of the Estado Novo. Scholars such as Stanley G. Payne, Thomas Gerard Gallagher, Juan José Linz, António Costa Pinto, Roger Griffin, Robert Paxton and Howard J. Wiarda, prefer to consider the Portuguese Estado Novo as conservative authoritarian rather than fascist. On the other hand, Portuguese scholars like Fernando Rosas, Manuel Villaverde Cabral, Manuel de Lucena and Manuel Loff think that the Estado Novo should be considered fascist.

History 
The party was founded in 1930 during the Ditadura Nacional period. Officially it was not a political party but an "organization of unity of all the Portuguese". Salazar in the speech that launched the party, was vague in terms of its role, and he incorporated all the parties supporting the dictatorship, whether republican, monarchic or catholic. Its first organic principles expressly declared that “all citizens, regardless of their political or religious beliefs” would be admitted as long as they adhered to the principles of Salazar’s speech of 30 June 1930.

The National Union was formed as a subservient umbrella organization to support the regime itself. It was the only party legally allowed under the Estado Novo regime; all other political parties were banned and persecuted, this later included the National Syndicalists, led by Francisco Rolão Preto, who were originally supporters. In 1934 Salazar arrested and exiled Francisco Rolão Preto as a part of a purge of the leadership of the Portuguese National Syndicalists. The Portuguese National Syndicalists broke into factions, some going into exile while the majority ended up joining the National Union. Salazar denounced the National Syndicalists as "inspired by certain foreign models" (meaning German Nazism) and condemned their "exaltation of youth, the cult of force through direct action, the principle of the superiority of state political power in social life, [and] the propensity for organizing masses behind a single leader" as fundamental differences between fascism and the Catholic corporatism of the Estado Novo.

The first leader of the National Union was the Interior Minister Colonel Lopes Mateus. The composition of the Central Commission indicated that the party was meant to support the regime rather than militate for it. Salazar became President, and Albino dos Reis, a former member of the Cunha Leal ULR, was nominated Vice President. The first Central Commission was composed by Bissaia Barreto, João Amaral, a judge and an integralist monarchist, and Nuno Mexia, who had been linked to the Union of Economic Interests (União dos Interesses Económicos) in the 1920s. Appointment to lead the party meant either "retirement" or a prestigious pause from government duties. The absence of youth was a characteristic of the National Union, particularly in the 1930s. At the first Congress, 68% of the delegates were over 40 years old.

According to historian António Costa Pinto, the National Union is an example of extreme weakness among dictatorships with weak single parties. There was no internal party activity until 1933. From 1934 onwards, after the creation of the regime’s new institutions, the National Union embarked on a period of lethargy from which it did not emerge until 1944. This lethargy can be partly explained by the affirmation by the regime that it did not attribute great importance to it beyond its utility as an electoral and legitimating vehicle.

The Estado Novo also created state bodies for propaganda, youth and labour, but they were not connected with the party.
 
In 1938 Salazar recognized that National Union's activities “were successively diminished until they had almost been extinguished”. With World War II's end, the National Union came to life again. In October 1945, Salazar announced a liberalization program designed to restore civil rights that had been suppressed during the Spanish Civil War and World War II in hopes of improving the image of his regime in Western circles. The measures included parliamentary elections, a general political amnesty, restoration of freedom of the press, curtailment of legal repression and a commitment to introduce the right of habeas corpus. The opposition to Salazar started to organize itself around a broad coalition, the Movement of Democratic Unity (MUD), which ranged from ultra-Catholics and fringe elements of the extreme right to the Portuguese Communist Party. Initially, the moderate opposition controlled the MUD, but it soon became strongly influenced by the Communist Party, which controlled it's youth wing. In the leadership were several communists, among them Octávio Pato, Salgado Zenha, Mário Soares, Júlio Pomar and Mário Sacramento.

The opposition Movement of Democratic Unity was legal between 1945 and 1948, but even then, the political system was so heavily rigged that it had no realistic chance of winning.

The party won all seats in elections to the National Assembly of Portugal from 1934 to 1973. Opposition candidates were nominally allowed after 1945 but prematurely withdrew in the 1945 and 1973 legislative elections. In 1970, two years after Salazar had been replaced as a leader and prime minister by Marcelo Caetano, the name of the party was changed to Acção Nacional Popular ("People's National Action"). Subsequent to Salazar's retirement, the party faced formal competition in the 1969 legislative election. However, the conduct of this election was little different from past contests, with the ANP winning all constituencies in a landslide.

The party had no real philosophy apart from support for the regime. The National Syndicalist leader, Francisco Rolão Preto criticized the National Union in 1945 as a “grouping of moderates of all parties, bourgeois without soul or faith in the national and revolutionary imperatives of our time”.

As a result of its lack of ideology, it disappeared in short order after the Portuguese Revolution of 1974. It has never been revived, and no party claiming to be its heir has won any seats in the Assembly of the Republic in modern Portugal.

Presidents

Electoral history

Presidential elections

National Assembly elections

Notes

References

Sources
  online free
 
 
 
 
 

 

Defunct political parties in Portugal
Political parties established in 1930
Political parties disestablished in 1974
Parties of one-party systems
Estado Novo (Portugal)
20th century in Portugal
Political history of Portugal
Portuguese nationalism
Corporatism
National conservative parties
Social conservative parties